The Balhae (or Bohai) kingdom controlled the northern Korean Peninsula, the area from the Amur River (Heilong Jiang) to the Strait of Tartary, and the Liaodong Peninsula. Similar to the workings of the Chinese Tang dynasty, the administration system of the Balhae kingdom was composed of:
5 capitals: a Supreme capital with four secondary capitals
15 provinces; and
62 prefectures.

Table of provinces

Former Balhae provinces 

Manzhou Yuanliu Kao provides records which show that the Balhae had occupied the Bisa Fortress at the southern tip of the Liaodong Peninsula. The History of Liao records that the Balhae established provinces at the Sin Fortress, Gaemo Fortress, Baegam Fortress, Yodong Fortress and Ansi Fortress area in Liaodong, as well as a substantial portion of the Liaoxi area. The Balhae sovereign's message to Yamato Kingdom in 796 states that it has recovered the entire old Goguryeo territory and its ruler's authority now shines beyond the Liao River. The Balhae came to occupy the Songhua and Wusuli River basins as well as the whole adjoining coastal zone along the Sea of Japan (East Sea).

 약홀주(若忽州) (present-day Dandong)
 목저주(木底州) (present-day Yewutai (葉武臺), Faku County, Liaoning Province, near the Taizi River)
 현도주 (玄兎州) (near present-day Manzhouli)

Correspondence 
 Balhae Provinces coming from Andong protectorate :
Namhae province is corresponding to former Qusu (Hangul: 거소주 Hanja/Hanzi :去素州), Qudan (Hangul: 거단주 Hanja/Hanzi :去旦州), 식리주(識利州)
Wolhui province  is corresponding to former Yuexi (Hangul: 월희주 Hanja/Hanzi :越喜州)
Dongpyeong is corresponding to former Funie 불열주(拂涅州)
Jangnyung  is corresponding to former 제북주(諸北州)
Yalu is corresponding to former 안시주(安市州) and 창암주(倉巖州)
Hoewon is corresponding to former 연진주(延津州)
Hyeondeok is corresponding to former 여산주(黎山州)

See also 
 List of Provinces of Liao

External links 
  발해내 말갈의 위치에 관한 지도
  발해 행정지도 5경 15부 62주
  발해의 행정지도
  Ningan the Supreme Capital of Balhae Kingdom
  渤海国行政区划(转贴)(中，朝)
 The Union of the Ye-mack Tungus and the Mohe-Ruzhen Tungus

Balhae
Subdivisions of Korea
History of Korea
Balhae, provinces